Scholarship America is a Minnesota-based American philanthropic organization that assists communities, corporations, foundations and individuals with fundraising, managing and awarding scholarships to students. The organization designs, administers and manages corporate and foundation scholarship programs; it also operates Dollars for Scholars, a coalition of local scholarship organizations in communities across the United States. 

Scholarship America also administers several special scholarship initiatives, including the Dreamkeepers Emergency Financial Aid program for community college students, and the Families of Freedom Scholarship Fund, which has to date distributed more than $100 million to dependents of those killed or disabled during the September 11, 2001 attacks, and will provide financial assistance to dependents in need through the 2030 academic year.

Dollars for Scholars was founded in 1958 by Dr. Irving Fradkin, an optometrist in Fall River, Massachusetts, and Scholarship America was officially chartered under the name "Citizens' Scholarship Foundation of America" on May 15, 1961. Scholarship America's President and CEO is Mike Nylund.

In fiscal year 2016, Scholarship America distributed more than $225 million to more than 100,000 American and international students through its programs. In 2012, Forbes ranked Scholarship America as the 83rd largest U.S. charity (out of 100) with total revenues of $155 million.

Timeline
Dollars for Scholars, the initial program that would become Scholarship America, was originally conceived by Fradkin during a campaign for the Fall River school board in 1957, as a way of ensuring that community members could contribute to a citywide scholarship fund through small donations. Fradkin lost the election, but began fundraising for Dollars for Scholars, starting the Fall River chapter in 1958.

Dollars for Scholars incorporated as a 501(c)(3) organization in May 1961, under the name of Citizens' Scholarship Foundation of America (CSFA). During its early years, CSFA's headquarters moved from Fall River to Boston; to Concord, NH; and opened its first regional office in St. Peter, MN, in 1976, thanks to a grant from the Bush Foundation.

Also in 1976, CSFA expanded from its community-based Dollars for Scholars roots with the establishment of Scholarship Management Services (SMS), a branch of the organization designed to manage corporate scholarships. The Toro company of Minnesota became SMS's first client.

In 1984, the organization's board voted to move CSFA's headquarters to St. Peter, MN, where they remain today. That year, CSFA reached the $5 million mark in terms of scholarship funds distributed. Throughout the 1980s and early 1990s, the organization grew rapidly and launched its Collegiate Partner initiative (in which colleges agreed to maximize CSFA-related aid to students on their campuses) and ScholarShop program (a junior high and high school college-readiness curriculum.)

In September 2001, CSFA created the Families of Freedom Scholarship Fund after the attacks on New York City and Washington, D.C. With President Bill Clinton and Senator Bob Dole as co-chairs of the fundraising campaign, the Families of Freedom Scholarship Fund raised more than $100 million, which it continues to distribute to the dependents of those killed or permanently disabled in the attacks, rescue and cleanup efforts.

On January 1, 2003, CSFA changed its name to Scholarship America; in the spring of that year, the organization surpassed the $1 billion mark in terms of funds distributed to students.

On December 4, 2014, Scholarship America announced a commitment to increase the number of colleges and universities with which it partners to support low- to moderate-income students and communities of greatest need. The new focus was announced alongside Scholarship America's attendance at the second White House College Opportunity Day of Action, where organizations announced over 600 new actions to help more students prepare for and graduate from college.

As of the end of fiscal year 2016, Scholarship America had distributed more than $3.7 billion to 2.3 million students across the country.

Programs
Scholarship America designs, manages and administers scholarship, tuition assistance, loan management and other education programs for corporations, foundations and individuals. In addition to this core business, the organization identifies the following as core programs and initiatives:

Dollars for Scholars, Scholarship America's first program, is a nationwide coalition of local, community-based scholarship organizations.
Scholarship America's Dreamkeepers program helps students stay in college when faced with an unforeseen financial emergency.
The Families of Freedom Scholarship Fund, which is managed by Scholarship America, provides education assistance for postsecondary study to financially needy dependents of those killed or permanently disabled as a result of the September 11, 2001 attacks.
Collegiate Partners are postsecondary institutions that ensure that scholarships awarded through Scholarship America programs help meet students' unmet financial needs. Some Collegiate Partners agree to match scholarships from Scholarship America programs, up to a specific dollar amount.
The Scholarship America Dream Award, the organization's newest scholarship program, is a multi-year, performance-based scholarship fund targeted toward postsecondary completion. The scholarship program received its initial funding from proceeds from Katie Couric's book, The Best Advice I Ever Got: Lessons from Extraordinary Lives.

Recognition
Scholarship America has been highly rated  by Charity Navigator for more than a decade.

The Chronicle of Philanthropy recognizes Scholarship America as one of America's largest nonprofits as part of its Philanthropy 400. In 2014, Scholarship America ranked #158 on the list. As of 2013, the Minneapolis / St. Paul Business Journal recognizes Scholarship America as Minnesota's second-largest charity.

Katie Couric, a supporter of Scholarship America, invited the organization to appear on her talk show, Katie, on two occasions: to celebrate its founder, Dr. Fradkin, and to announce the first class of Dream Award recipients.

In June 2014, Senior Vice President of Education Programs and Policy, Max Espinoza, represented Scholarship America at the White House. The visits included meeting President Barack Obama, as he signed an executive order to aid student loan debtors, and a roundtable discussion on college affordability with Second Lady Dr. Jill Biden and Secretary of State Arne Duncan.

References

External links
Scholarship America website
Dollars for Scholars website
Scholarship Management Services website
Dreamkeepers website
Families of Freedom Scholarship Fund website
Collegiate Partners page
Dream Award website
Scholarship America listing on CharityNavigator.org

Philanthropic organizations based in the United States
Organizations established in 1958
1958 establishments in Massachusetts